Arinal Djunaidi (born 17 June 1956) is an Indonesian politician and former civil servant who is the current Governor of Lampung.

Early life and education
Djunaidi was born in Tanjungkarang, Bandar Lampung on 17 June 1956. After completing his first nine years of education, he entered an agriculture trade school and later further studied agriculture at Lampung University.

Career
Djunaidi began working for Bandar Lampung's municipal government in 1986, moving to the provincial government by 1990. He worked in the agricultural department until 2005 - when he was the department head - before becoming head of the forestry department until 2010. Djunaidi then became assistant to the provincial secretary until 2014, when he himself became provincial secretary. 

In April 2016, Djunaidi threatened a local news reporter when the latter approached him over accusations of Djunaidi having abused a Garuda Indonesia staff, though Djunaidi later apologized for the threats. Djunaidi retired from being a civil servant on 30 June 2016. After his retirement, Djunaidi became the head of Golkar's provincial office in 2017. 

During the 2018 gubernatorial elections, Djunaidi ran as a gubernatorial candidate with the support of Golkar, PKB, and PAN with East Lampung regent Chusnunia Chalim as his running mate. The ticket secured 37.78% of the votes in a four-way contest to defeat incumbent Muhammad Ridho Ficardo, and the pair was sworn in on 12 June 2019.

References

1956 births
Governors of Lampung
People from Bandar Lampung
Golkar politicians
Indonesian civil servants
Living people